Asim Azhar (born 29 October 1996) is a Pakistani singer, songwriter, musician and an actor. He started his career as a singer on YouTube, covering contemporary Western songs before he became a public figure.

Career 
Asim Azhar was born on 29 October 1996. Born to Azhar Hussain, and actress Gul-e-Rana. He became popular because of his songs recorded in Coke Studio 9.

 His most recent song is the HBL PSL 5 Official Anthem "Tayyar Hain" along with Ali Azmat, Arif Lohar and Haroon. In February 2020, He received The Best Stylish Performer award at PSA in Dubai. His song Jo Tu Na Mila featuring Iqra Aziz hit 100M views on YouTube making him fourth Pakistani singer to cross 100M views after Atif Aslam, Rahat Fateh Ali Khan and Momina Mustehsan in May 2020. Tera Woh Pyar, sung by Asim and Momina has also garnered over 140M views as of July 2020.

In 2019, Azhar also had an album with an Indian record company and a Bollywood single planned for release. As a result of the cross-border tensions between India and Pakistan, Azhar's plans with his record company, Universal Music India, came to a halt.

Discography

Singles

Soundtracks

Coke Studio Pakistan

Filmography

Awards and nominations 

! Ref
|-
! style="background:#bfd7ff" colspan="5"|Sony's MIX Audience Music Awards
|-
| 2019
| "Jo Tu Na Mila"
| Best Non-film Track
| 
|
|-
! style="background:#bfd7ff" colspan="5"|Hum Style Awards
|-
| 2020
| colspan="2"|Most Stylish Performer
| 
|
|}

References

External links
 
 

Living people
1996 births
Pakistani male singer-songwriters
Coke Studio (Pakistani TV program)